Zhuangbiao (裝裱) is a Chinese specialized framing method for paintings and calligraphy on rice papers. Materials include colored papers, fabrics, threads, wooden sticks, and glue, among others.

Arts in China
Chinese art